Glass: A Portrait of Philip in Twelve Parts (other titles include International title Glass, Hungarian title Glass - Philip portréja 12 felvonásban)  is a 2007 documentary on the life of American composer Philip Glass directed by Scott Hicks. The film was nominated for Emmy Awards and AFI Award

Cast
All the persons below play their own life roles.
JoAnne Akalaitis
Woody Allen
Holly Critchlow
Philip Glass
Errol Morris
Nico Muhly
Godfrey Reggio
Dennis Russell Davies
Martin Scorsese
Ravi Shankar

Reception
It holds an 84% rating on Rotten Tomatoes, and a rating score of 55 out of 100 on Metacritic.

Awards and nominations

References

External links

American documentary films
2007 documentary films
Documentary films about classical music and musicians
Films about pianos and pianists
Philip Glass
Films directed by Scott Hicks
2000s English-language films
2000s American films